is a train station on the Kyoto Municipal Subway Karasuma Line in Kamigyo-ku, Kyoto, Japan. It is the closest station to the Kyoto Imperial Palace.

Lines

 (Station Number: K06)

Layout
The station consists of one underground island platform serving two tracks.

Surrounding area
Around the station is the Kyoto Imperial Palace. The Imadegawa campus of Doshisha University is located nearby the station.

References

Railway stations in Kyoto Prefecture